Air/Space America 88 was an aviation exposition and airshow held at San Diego, California's Brown Field in late May of 1988. It was planned to be the western hemisphere's answer to the Paris Air Show and would be held every even year when the PAS was in hiatus. It was a mammoth event that attracted exhibitors from all over the world, including an Air France Concorde registered F-BVFF and an Antonov An-124. Many aircraft manufacturers brought their latest creations like Boeing's STOL YC-14. The U.S. Air Force Thunderbirds performed along with the usual aerobatic and demonstration flights. Founded by former US Congressman Robert Carlton "Bob" Wilson.  Former Vice President of the United States, George HW Bush presided at the ribbon cutting ceremony.  Congressman Wilson engaged Mr. Daniel S. Mitrovich to serve as Chief Protocol Officer for the visiting Soviets Air expedition with the worlds largest Aircrat the Antonov An-124 Russian aircraft. Mr. Mitrovich was the first American to fly on the worlds largest aircraft at the invitation of the soviet pilots.

Air/Space America 88 was a tremendous success as an Air Show but was a financial failure resulting in the cancellation of Air/Space America 90.

External links
 Los Angeles Times article - San Diego cancels 1990 Air Show
 Flight International Article - Air/Space America '88 is on

Air shows in the United States
Transportation in San Diego
1980s in San Diego
Aviation in California
1988 in California
May 1988 events in the United States